Springwater is an unincorporated rural community in Clackamas County, Oregon, United States, about three miles south of Estacada on Oregon Route 211. So-named since pioneer days, it was one of the first places on the upper Clackamas River to have a post office. Springwater post office ran from 1874–1914, with George A. Crawford as the first postmaster. The historic wooden Springwater Presbyterian Church was built c. 1890. The Springwater Grange has celebrated a Springwater Fair every year since 1923.

See also
Springwater Corridor

References

External links
Historic image of Springwater Presbyterian Church from Salem Public Library
Springwater Cemetery
Springwater Presbyterian Church

Unincorporated communities in Clackamas County, Oregon
1874 establishments in Oregon
Populated places established in 1874
Unincorporated communities in Oregon